John Bremle (fl.1407), was an English Member of Parliament.

He was a Member (MP) of the Parliament of England for Shaftesbury in 1407. He is unidentified.

References

14th-century births
15th-century deaths
English MPs 1407